In musical tuning and harmony, the  (German for 'tone network') is a conceptual lattice diagram representing tonal space first described by Leonhard Euler in 1739. Various visual representations of the Tonnetz can be used to show traditional harmonic relationships in European classical music.

History through 1900

The Tonnetz originally appeared in Leonhard Euler's 1739 . Euler's Tonnetz, pictured at left, shows the triadic relationships of the perfect fifth and the major third: at the top of the image is the note F, and to the left underneath is C (a perfect fifth above F), and to the right is A (a major third above F). The Tonnetz was rediscovered in 1858 by Ernst Naumann, and was disseminated in an 1866 treatise of Arthur von Oettingen. Oettingen and the influential musicologist Hugo Riemann (not to be confused with the mathematician Bernhard Riemann) explored the capacity of the space to chart harmonic motion between chords and modulation between keys. Similar understandings of the Tonnetz appeared in the work of many late-19th century German music theorists.

Oettingen and Riemann both conceived of the relationships in the chart being defined through just intonation, which uses pure intervals. One can extend out one of the horizontal rows of the Tonnetz indefinitely, to form a never-ending sequence of perfect fifths: F-C-G-D-A-E-B-F♯-C♯-G♯-D♯-A♯-E♯-B♯-F𝄪-C𝄪-G𝄪- (etc.) Starting with F, after 12 perfect fifths, one reaches E♯. Perfect fifths in just intonation are slightly larger than the compromised fifths used in equal temperament tuning systems more common in the present. This means that when one stacks 12 fifths starting from F, the E♯ we arrive at will not be seven octaves above the F we started with. Oettingen and Riemann's Tonnetz thus extended on infinitely in every direction without actually repeating any pitches. In the twentieth century, composer-theorists such as Ben Johnston and James Tenney continued to developed theories and applications involving just-intoned Tonnetze.

The appeal of the Tonnetz to 19th-century German theorists was that it allows spatial representations of tonal distance and tonal relationships. For example, looking at the dark blue A minor triad in the graphic at the beginning of the article, its parallel major triad (A-C♯-E) is the triangle right below, sharing the vertices A and E. The relative major of A minor, C major (C-E-G) is the upper-right adjacent triangle, sharing the C and the E vertices. The dominant triad of A minor, E major (E-G♯-B) is diagonally across the E vertex, and shares no other vertices. One important point is that every shared vertex between a pair of triangles is a shared pitch between chords - the more shared vertices, the more shared pitches the chord will have. This provides a visualization of the principle of parsimonious voice-leading, in which motions between chords are considered smoother when fewer pitches change. This principle is especially important in analyzing the music of late-19th century composers like Wagner, who frequently avoided traditional tonal relationships.

Twentieth-century reinterpretation

Recent research by Neo-Riemannian music theorists David Lewin, Brian Hyer, and others, have revived the Tonnetz to further explore properties of pitch structures. Modern music theorists generally construct the Tonnetz using equal temperament, and using pitch-classes, which make no distinction between octave transpositions of a pitch. Under equal temperament, the never-ending series of ascending fifths mentioned earlier becomes a cycle. Neo-Riemannian theorists typically assume enharmonic equivalence (in other words, A♭ = G♯), and so the two-dimensional plane of the 19th-century Tonnetz cycles in on itself in two different directions, and is mathematically isomorphic to a torus. Theorists have studied the structure of this new cyclical version using mathematical group theory.

Neo-Riemannian theorists have also used the Tonnetz to visualize non-tonal triadic relationships. For example, the diagonal going up and to the left from C in the diagram at the beginning of the article forms a division of the octave in three major thirds: C-A♭-E-C (the E is actually an F♭, and the final C a D♭♭). Richard Cohn argues that while a sequence of triads built on these three pitches (C major, A♭ major, and E major) cannot be adequately described using traditional concepts of functional harmony, this cycle has smooth voice leading and other important group properties which can be easily observed on the Tonnetz.

Similarities to other graphical systems
The harmonic table note layout is a recently developed musical interface that uses a note layout topologically equivalent to the Tonnetz.

A Tonnetz of the syntonic temperament can be derived from a given isomorphic keyboard by connecting lines of successive perfect fifths, lines of successive major thirds, and lines of successive minor thirds. Like a Tonnetz itself, the isomorphic keyboard is tuning invariant.
The topology of the syntonic temperament's Tonnetz is generally cylindrical.

The Tonnetz is the dual graph of Schoenberg's chart of the regions, and of course vice versa. Research into music cognition has demonstrated that the human brain uses a "chart of the regions" to process tonal relationships.

See also
 Neo-Riemannian theory
 Musical set-theory
 Riemannian theory
 Transformational theory
 Tuning theory
 Treatise on Harmony

References

Further reading
Johnston, Ben (2006). "Rational Structure in Music", "Maximum Clarity" and Other Writings on Music, edited by Bob Gilmore. Urbana: University of Illinois Press. .
Wannamaker, Robert, The Music of James Tenney, Volume 1: Contexts and Paradigms (University of Illinois Press, 2021), 155-65.</ref>

External links
 Music harmony and donuts by Paul Dysart
 Charting Enharmonicism on the Just-Intonation Tonnetz by Robert T. Kelley
   Midi-Instrument based on Tonnetz (Melodic Table) by The Shape of Music
 Midi-Instrument based on Tonnetz (Harmonic Table) by C-Thru-Music
 TonnetzViz (interactive visualization) by Ondřej Cífka; a modified version by Anton Salikhmetov

Diagrams
Lattice theory
Pitch space
Topology